Zbigniew Szewczyk (born 29 November 1967) is a Polish former professional footballer who played as a midfielder.

Szewczyk made a total of 192 appearances in the Ekstraklasa for Zagłębie Lubin during his playing career.

References 

 
 

1967 births
Living people
People from Bolesławiec
Polish footballers
Association football midfielders
Ekstraklasa players
2. Bundesliga players
Zagłębie Lubin players
SV Meppen players
Tennis Borussia Berlin players
Górnik Polkowice players
Polish expatriate footballers
Expatriate footballers in Germany
Sportspeople from Lower Silesian Voivodeship